Prinsesa ng Buhay Ko (International title: My Girl / ) is a Philippine television drama romantic comedy series broadcast by GMA Network. Directed by Dondon Santos, it stars Kris Bernal and Aljur Abrenica. It premiered on September 23, 2013 on the network's Telebabad line up replacing Binoy Henyo. The series concluded on January 24, 2014 with a total of 90 episodes. It was replaced by Paraiso Ko'y Ikaw in its timeslot.

Cast and characters

Lead cast
 Kris Bernal as Princess "Cess" Inocencio-Grande
 Aljur Abrenica as Niccolo "Nick" Grande

Supporting cast
 Renz Fernandez as Louise Grande
 LJ Reyes as Kate Napoleon
 Carmi Martin as Eliza Montes-Grande
 Maritoni Fernandez as Tess de Leon
 Susan Africa as Alicia Salazar
 Ping Medina as Steve Amador
 Marco Alcaraz as Waldo Salazar
 Lian Paz as Violet Salazar
 Vincent Magbanua as Vicvic

Guest cast
 Ryza Cenon as Selena Monteverde
 John Feir as Johnny Napoleon
 Julie Lee as Trina Zaragosa
 Mark Anthony Fernandez as Benedict Bautista

Ratings
According to AGB Nielsen Philippines' Mega Manila household television ratings, the pilot episode of Prinsesa ng Buhay Ko earned an 18.2% rating. While the final episode scored a 14.9% rating.

References

External links
 

2013 Philippine television series debuts
2014 Philippine television series endings
Filipino-language television shows
GMA Network drama series
Philippine romantic comedy television series
Television shows set in Quezon City